The Commanding Officer is a 1915 American silent drama film directed by Allan Dwan that was based upon a play by Theodore Burt. The film stars Alice Dovey, Donald Crisp, Marshall Neilan, Douglas Gerrard, Ethel Phillips, Russell Bassett, and Bob Emmons. The film was released on March 25, 1915, by Paramount Pictures.

Plot
When Colonel Archer does not want to lend money to Captain Waring, he borrows that amount from Brent Lindsay in the village in exchange for his promissory note. Both Waring and Lindsay court Floyd Bingham, a retired colonel's daughter. Floyd discovers that Lindsay is dating the dancer Queen. On the advice of her father, she accepts Archer's marriage proposal, who has to take care of the two children of his dead sister. When Lindsay continues to harass Floyd, Archer gets into a fight with her. Floyd and Lindsay then go for a walk in the woods. They kiss and Waring takes a picture of them, which he uses to blackmail Lindsay. When Lindsay is later found dead, Archer is arrested. The villagers want to see it hanging. However, Queen witnessed the murder and clears his name just in time.

Cast  
Alice Dovey as Floyd Bingham
Donald Crisp as Col. Archer
Marshall Neilan as Capt. Waring
Douglas Gerrard as Brent Lindsay
Ethel Phillips as The Queen
Russell Bassett as Col. Bingham 
Bob Emmons as The Sheriff
Jack Pickford as The Commandant's Orderly
Francis Carpenter as The Boy
Olive Johnson as The Girl

References

External links 
 

1915 films
1910s English-language films
Silent American drama films
1915 drama films
Paramount Pictures films
Films directed by Allan Dwan
American black-and-white films
American silent feature films
1910s American films